Capital may refer to:

Common uses
 Capital city, a municipality of primary status
 List of national capital cities
 Capital letter, an upper-case letter

Economics and social sciences
 Capital (economics), the durable produced goods used for further production
Economic capital
Financial capital, an economic resource measured in terms of money
Capital (Marxism), a central concept in Marxian critique of political economy
Capital good
Natural capital
Public capital
Human capital
Instructional capital
Social capital

Architecture and buildings
 Capital (architecture), the topmost member of a column or pilaster
 Capital (fortification), a proportion of a bastion
 The Capital (building), a commercial building in Mumbai, India

Arts, entertainment and media

Literature

Books
 Das Kapital ('Capital: Critique of Political Economy'), a foundational theoretical text by Karl Marx
 Capital: The Eruption of Delhi, a 2014 book by Rana Dasgupta
 Capital (novel), by John Lanchester, 2012
 Capital in the Twenty-First Century by Thomas Piketty, 2013

Periodicals
 Capital (French magazine), a French-language magazine
 Capital (German magazine), a German-language magazine
 Capital (newspaper), in Bulgaria
 Capital (Romanian newspaper)
 Capital (Ukrainian newspaper)
 Kapital (newspaper), in North Macedonia
 Kapital (magazine), in Norway
 Capital (Ethiopia), a newspaper
 Capital New York, an online news site owned by Politico
 A Capital, a defunct daily newspaper in Lisbon, Portugal
 The Capital, a daily newspaper based in Annapolis, Maryland, U.S.

Film and television
 Capital (film), a 2012 French drama
 Capital (Iranian TV series), 2011–2020
 Capital (British TV series), a 2015 adaptation of Lanchester's novel
 Capital TV, a former British rolling-music TV channel 
 Capital TV (Belarus), a TV channel
 CTC (TV station), formerly called Capital Television, Ten Capital and Capital 7
 Capital Television (New Zealand), a former television channel in Wellington, the capital of New Zealand, operated by TVNZ.

Music
 Capital (band), a British band
 Capital (album), by Mick Softley, 1976
 "Capital (It Fails Us Now)", a song by Gang of Four from the 1982 album Another Day/Another Dollar

Radio
 Capital Radio (disambiguation), several uses
 Capital (radio network), a network of British local radio stations

Education 
 Capital College (disambiguation), the name of several institutions
 Lancaster Bible College Capital Seminary and Graduate School, in Lancaster, Pennsylvania, U.S.
 Capital Community College, in Hartford, Connecticut, U.S.
 Capital University, in Bexley, Ohio, U.S.
 Capital University, Jharkhand, India

Sports 
 Capital CF, a Brazilian football club
 Delhi Capitals, an Indian cricket team
 Delhi Capitals (basketball), India
 Edinburgh Capitals, a Scottish ice-hockey team
 Edmonton Capitals, a Canadian baseball team
 University of Canberra Capitals, an Australian women's basketball team
 Vienna Capitals, an Austrian ice-hockey team
 Washington Capitals, an American ice hockey team

Transportation
 Capital (sidewheeler), a 19th-century American steamboat
 Capital Airlines (disambiguation), several uses
 Capital ship, a classification of a naval vessel

Other uses
Capitals (typeface), a serif font composed entirely of capital letters

See also 
 
 
 Capitalism (disambiguation)
 Capitalization (disambiguation)
 Capital City (disambiguation)
 Capital region (disambiguation)
 Captal, a medieval feudal title in Gascony
 Capital (economics)

External link